Adhanakurichi is a village in the Sendurai taluk of Ariyalur district, Tamil Nadu, India.

Demographics 

As per the 2001 census, Adhanakurichi had a total population of 3528 with 1802 males and 1726 females.

References 

Villages in Ariyalur district